National symbols of Korea may refer to:

National symbols of North Korea
National symbols of South Korea